Longitarsus candidulus is a species of beetle in the subfamily Galerucinae that can be found in Croatia, France, Italy (including the islands of Corsica and Sardinia), Portugal, Spain, and Yugoslavia.

References

C
Beetles described in 1860
Beetles of Europe